101 Montgomery (also known as The Schwab Building) is a high-rise office building located in San Francisco, California. The building rises  in the northern region of San Francisco's Financial District. It contains 28 floors, and was completed in 1984. 101 Montgomery is currently tied with Embarcadero West as the 39th-tallest building in the city. The building's developer was Cahill Contractors. The building has earlier served as the headquarters of Charles Schwab & Company.

See also
 List of tallest buildings in San Francisco

External links

 101 Montgomery on Emporis
 101 Montgomery on SkyscraperPage

Skyscraper office buildings in San Francisco
Office buildings completed in 1984
Financial District, San Francisco
1984 establishments in California